Cedar Catholic High School is a private, Roman Catholic high school in Hartington, Nebraska, United States.  It is located in the Roman Catholic Archdiocese of Omaha.

History
The school was founded in 1901 as Holy Trinity School, established by Holy Trinity Catholic Church in Hartington, NE. In the 1963 at the direction of Archbishop Gerald T. Bergan, Cedar Catholic High School was established as a central high school and supported by ten Catholic parishes in Cedar County, Nebraska. The elementary Catholic school in Hartington, NE retains the Holy Trinity name.

Athletics
Cedar Catholic is a member of the Nebraska School Activities Association.  The school has won the following NSAA state championships:

 Boys' basketball—1980, 1984
 Boys' golf—1995, 2005, 2009 
 Girls' volleyball—1989, 2012
 Girls' basketball—1986
 Boys' bowling—2012

Notable alumni
 Russ Hochstein, NFL player for the Denver Broncos, former player for the Nebraska Cornhuskers; two-time Super Bowl Champion with the New England Patriots (XXXVIII, XXXIX)
 Charles Thone, US Representative 1971–79, governor of Nebraska 1979-83

References

External links
 
 School website

Catholic secondary schools in Nebraska
Schools in Cedar County, Nebraska
Roman Catholic Archdiocese of Omaha